Cottus microstomus is a species of freshwater ray-finned fish belonging to the family Cottidae, the typical sculpins. It is found in Eastern Europe and is widespread in the Dniester drainage (Black Sea basin), Odra and Vistula drainages (southern Baltic basin), most likely extending further east to the Gulf of Finland. It is part of the wider European Cottus gobio complex, and possibly makes hybrid zones with Cottus gobio (European bullhead) and Cottus koshewnikowi.  It is a demersal fish, up to 10.1 cm long.

References

Cottus (fish)
Fish described in 1837
Freshwater fish
Fish of the Baltic Sea
Fish of Europe
Fish of Russia